Christian Müller (born 13 August 1983 in Offenbach am Main) is a German footballer.

External links 
 

1983 births
Living people
Sportspeople from Offenbach am Main
German footballers
Association football defenders
2. Bundesliga players
3. Liga players
Kickers Offenbach players
FC Augsburg players
FSV Frankfurt players
RB Leipzig players
Footballers from Hesse